Patrik Kolář (born 30 October 1981) is a retired Czech football goalkeeper. He played in the Gambrinus liga for České Budějovice and Teplice, playing a total of four seasons in the top flight. He also played in the 2003–04 UEFA Cup, keeping goal for Teplice in both matches in the second round against Feyenoord, over the course of which he conceded only one goal and Teplice went through to the next round 3–1 on aggregate.

Kolář played international football at under-21 level for Czech Republic U21.

References

External links 

1981 births
Living people
Czech footballers
Association football goalkeepers
Czech Republic youth international footballers
Czech Republic under-21 international footballers
Czech First League players
SK Dynamo České Budějovice players
FK Teplice players